The 1967 All-Ireland Senior Hurling Championship Final was the 80th All-Ireland Final and the culmination of the 1967 All-Ireland Senior Hurling Championship, an inter-county hurling tournament for the top teams in Ireland. The match was held at Croke Park, Dublin, on 3 September 1967, between Kilkenny and Tipperary. The Munster champions lost to their Leinster opponents on a score line of 3-8 to 2-7.

The match is notable as it was Kilkenny's first defeat of Tipperary in the championship since the All-Ireland final of 1922.

Match details

All-Ireland Senior Hurling Championship Final
All-Ireland Senior Hurling Championship Final, 1967
All-Ireland Senior Hurling Championship Final
All-Ireland Senior Hurling Championship Finals
Kilkenny GAA matches
Tipperary GAA matches